This is a list of by-elections to Dáil Éireann, the house of representatives of the Oireachtas, the Irish legislature. By-elections in Ireland occur to fill vacant seats which can be caused by the death, resignation, disqualification or expulsion of a sitting Teachta Dála (member of parliament). Under the Electoral (Amendment) Act 2011, the writ for the by-election must be issued within six months of the vacancy.

There have been 138 by-elections since 1923, to fill 140 vacancies. 93 of these were caused by the death of a sitting Teachta Dála (TD). There were no by-elections during the 3rd, 7th, 9th, 11th, 22nd, 25th and 26th Dála. The longest period without a by-election was almost 10 years between 1984 and 1994. The largest number of by-elections on one day was on 11 March 1925, when seven constituencies filled nine vacancies caused by the National Party's split from Cumann na nGaedheal. Those seven by-elections included two which filled two vacancies, via the single transferable vote. All the other by-elections have used its single-winner analogue, the alternative vote.

Twenty-five TDs who were elected at a by-election were not subsequently re-elected at a general election. The only person twice elected at by-elections was Thomas Hennessy.

First and Second Dáil
The First Dáil was established by Sinn Féin members returned in the 1918 election to the House of Commons of the United Kingdom. Convention in the Commons was that the writ for a by-election be moved by a party colleague of the vacating member, which was impossible for the abstentionist Sinn Féin. There were three by-elections held for Westminster constituencies vacated by Unionist members during the lifetime of the First Dáil, all of whom took their seats in Westminster.

The Second Dáil comprised those returned in the 1921 elections to the House of Commons of Southern Ireland and the House of Commons of Northern Ireland. There were no by-elections to either body during the lifetime of the Second Dáil.

By-elections since 1923
By-elections in which seats changed parties are indicated with a grey background.

Vacancies not filled

When Pierce McCan died on 6 March 1919, his East Tipperary seat was left vacant at Westminster. In April 1919 a Dáil committee considering how to fill the vacancy considered allowing nomination by the Labour Party (which had stood aside in the 1918 election to avoid splitting the nationalist vote) before recommending that the Sinn Féin constituency organisation should nominate. However, in June 1919 the Dáil decided that "it was due to the memory of the late Pierce McCann that his place should not be filled at present". Later vacancies were also left unfilled; when Diarmuid Lynch resigned his seat in 1920, Arthur Griffith said "as the letter of resignation was addressed to the people of South-East Cork, the next step in the matter lay with the South-East Cork Executive of Sinn Fein". Asked in the Civil War about filling Third Dáil vacancies, W. T. Cosgrave as Chairman of the Provisional Government stated "the condition of the country scarcely warrants the holding of elections".

In the first Dáil, four Sinn Féin TDs represented two constituencies: Éamon de Valera, Arthur Griffith, Eoin MacNeill and Liam Mellowes. Ordinarily, this would prompt them to choose one constituency to represent, and to move a writ for a by-election in the other constituency.

TDs who died after the dissolution of the Dáil
Outgoing TDs who died after the dissolution of the Dáil but before the following election did not create a vacancy, as there was no Dáil in being at the time of their death.

See also
List of Seanad by-elections
List of Irish politicians who changed party affiliation

References

Notes

 
Ireland
By-elections